The 1992 France rugby union tour of Argentina was a series of match played by France rugby union team in June and July 1992, in Argentina.

France won both the official test match against the Pumas.

Matches
Scores and results list France's points tally first.

References 

France tour
Rugby union tours of Argentina
France national rugby union team tours
tour
rugby